Alexander Ray (born 3 October 1990) is a New Zealand racing cyclist, who currently rides for New Zealand amateur team Mitre 10 MEGA Masterton.

On 18 April 2018 Ray was hit by a car while training in Auckland, he was then put into an induced coma. Ray spent eight days in critical care in hospital.

Major results

2015
 6th Overall Joe Martin Stage Race
2016
 6th Overall Tour de Taiwan

References

External links

1990 births
Living people
New Zealand male cyclists
21st-century New Zealand people